Knut Schreiner (born 18 December 1974 in Bergen, Norway), is a Norwegian singer, musician and producer currently residing in Oslo. Also known by his stage name Euroboy, he has been part of important Norwegian bands like Kåre and The Cavemen known in its last years as Euroboys, with Turbonegro known in Norway as Turboneger, in the musical project Black Diamond Brigade and recently is a member of Mirror Lakes. He has also been in other musical projects and produced other bands, notably Euroboys, Amulet and The Lovethugs.

As Euroboy
Knut Schreiner himself took the stage name Euroboy at the time and was widely known by that moniker. As Euroboy, Schreiner usually appeared on stage in an all black attire, sporting a Schutz-Staffel Totenkopf officer's hat. His style of playing was strongly influenced by James Williamson of the Stooges from 1971 to 1974. He was also influenced by Ace Frehley of KISS and Angus Young of AC/DC.

In Kåre and The Cavemen / Euroboys
Knut "Euroboy" Schreiner was also a long-standing vocalist for Kåre and The Cavemen from 1990 to 2000. In its last year the band changed its name to Euroboys before splitting up.

Turbonegro / Turboneger
Schreiner is vocalist and lead guitar player in the Norwegian band Turbonegro, known in Norway as Turboneger (TRBNGR). The band was also known as Stierkampf. Turbonegro is a Norwegian punk rock band that was active from 1989-1998, and reformed in 2002. Their style combines glamrock, punkrock and hardrock into a style the band describes as deathpunk.

Other projects
Schreiner was also involved at various times in bands The Vikings and The Kwyet Kings.

He was also involved in the musical project Black Diamond Brigade, which released the single "Black Diamond", a cover of a Kiss song.

Knut Schreiner has produced bands such as Turbonegro, Amulet and The Lovethugs.

In 2002, he finished building his own studio with Anders Moller of Euroboys. It is called Crystal Canyon and is located in Oslo.

Mirror Lakes
He formed the band Mirror Lakes in 2010 in partnership with vocalist Frode Fivel. Other band members include Trond Mjøen, Havard Krogedal and Arne Mathisen. Their debut album was the eponymous album Mirror Lakes released in 2012.

Personal life
He studied at Oslo University

In March 2008 he was diagnosed with Hodgkin's Disease. In November, 2008, he stated in a blog entry that he was cured, and that there were no traces of it in his system.

Notes

External links
Turbonegro website

1974 births
Living people
Norwegian rock guitarists
Turbonegro members